Olga Grjasnowa (born 14 November 1984, in Baku, Azerbaijan Soviet Socialist Republic, USSR) is a German writer currently living in Berlin, Germany.

Personal life and education 
Olga Grjasnowa was born into a Russian-Jewish family in Baku, Azerbaijan. Her father, Oleg Grjasnow, practiced law and her mother, Julija Winnikowa, was a musicologist. The family came to Hesse in 1996 as so-called 'quota refugees' (Kontingentflüchtlinge). Grjasnowa started learning German when she was 11 years old. She completed her secondary education in Frankfurt. Beginning in 2005, Grjasnowa first pursued a degree in art history and Slavic studies at the University of Göttingen. She then changed courses to enroll in the "Creative Writing" program offered by the German Institute for Literature in Leipzig, obtaining her bachelor's degree in 2010. After studying abroad in Poland, Russia (at the Maxim Gorky Literature Institute), and Israel, Grjasnowa took up dance studies at the Free University of Berlin.

She was a member of the PEN Centre Germany.

Olga Grjasnowa is married to Syrian actor Ayham Majid Agha, with whom she has one daughter.

Writing career 
In 2007, Grjasnowa took part in the "Klagenfurter Literaturkurs". She received a scholarship from the Rosa Luxemburg Foundation in 2008. Grjasnowa took part in the "Jürgen-Ponto-Writer's-Workshop" in 2010. She received the WIENER WORTSTAETTEN'''s dramatist prize for her first play Mitfühlende Deutsche (Sympathetic Germans) in the same year. Grjasnowa was also awarded a Crossing Borders scholarship by the Robert Bosch Stiftung in 2011 and the Hermann Lenz Scholarship in 2012.

Her debut novel All Russians Love Birch Trees (published in the original as Der Russe ist einer, der Birken liebt) caused an immediate stir upon its publication in 2012 and was praised in the arts sections of many German newspapers.

 Works 
 
 
 

 English translation 
 

Audio books 
 Der Russe ist einer, der Birken liebt. 2012.
 Die juristische Unschärfe einer Ehe. 2014.
 City of Jasmine''. 2019.

Awards and recognition 

 2012: Anna Seghers-Preis 
 2012: Klaus-Michael Kühne Prize
 2012: Hermann-Lenz Scholarship 
 2014: Work stipend supporting professional authors by the Department of Culture of the Senate of Berlin
 2015: Adelbert von Chamisso Prize

Notes 

1984 births
21st-century German women writers
Living people